South Korean defectors are South Korean citizens who have defected to North Korea. After the Korean War, 333 South Korean prisoners of war detained in North Korea chose to stay in the country. During subsequent decades of the Cold War, some people of South Korean origin defected to North Korea as well. They include Roy Chung, a former U.S. Army soldier who defected to North Korea through East Germany in 1979. Aside from defection, North Korea has been accused of abduction in the disappearances of some South Koreans.

Occasionally, North Koreans who have defected to South Korea have decided to return. Since South Korea does not permit its naturalized citizens to travel to the North, they have made their way back to their home country illegally, and thus became "double defectors". From a total of 25,000 North Korean defectors living in South Korea, about 800 are missing, some of whom may have returned to the North. The South Korean Ministry of Unification recognizes only 13 defections officially, .

Background

Both sides have recognized the propaganda value of defectors, even immediately after the Division of Korea in 1945. Since then, the number of defectors has been used by both the North and the South (see North Korean defectors) to try to prove the superiority of their respective political systems (the country of destination).

North Korean propaganda has targeted South Korean soldiers patrolling the Korean Demilitarized Zone (DMZ).

Aftermath of the Korean War

A total of 357 prisoners of war detained in North Korea after the Korean War chose to stay in North Korea rather than be repatriated home to the South. These included 333 South Koreans, 23 Americans, and one Briton. Eight South Koreans and two of the Americans later changed their mind. However, the exact number of prisoners of war held by North Korea and China has been disputed since 1953, due to unaccounted South Korean soldiers. Several South Koreans defected to the North during the Cold War: In 1953, Kim Sung Bai, a captain in the South Korean air force, defected to North Korea with his F51 Mustang. In 1985, Ra il Ryong, a South Korean private, defected to North Korea and requested asylum. In 1988, a Korean employee at a U.S. army unit in South Korea defected to North Korea. His name was Son Chang-gu, a transport officer.

During the Cold War, several U.S. Army servicemen defected to North Korea. One of them, Roy Chung, was born to South Korean immigrants. Unlike the others who defected across the DMZ, he defected by first crossing the border between West and East Germany in 1979. His parents accused North Korea of abducting him. The United States was not interested in investigating the case, as he was not a "security risk", and in similar cases it was usually impossible to prove that a kidnapping had occurred. There were several other cases of South Koreans mysteriously disappearing and moving to North Korea at that time, including the case of a geology teacher from Seoul who disappeared in April 1979 while he was having a holiday in Norway. Some South Koreans also accused North Korea of attempting to kidnap them while staying abroad. These alleged kidnapping attempts occurred mainly in Europe, Japan or Hong Kong.

Double defectors

There are people who have defected from North Korea to South Korea, and then have defected back to North Korea again. In the first half of 2012 alone, there were 100 cases of "double defectors" like this. Possible reasons for double defectors are the safety of remaining family members left behind, North Korea's promises of forgiveness and other attempts to lure the defectors back, as well as widespread discrimination faced in South Korea. 7.2% of the North Korean defectors living in South Korea are unemployed, which is twice the national average. In 2013, there were 800 North Korean defectors unaccounted for out of 25,000 people. They might have gone to China or Southeast Asian countries on their way back to North Korea. South Korea's Unification Ministry officially recognizes only 13 cases of double defectors .

South Korea's laws do not allow naturalized North Koreans to return. North Korea has accused South Korea of abducting and forcibly interning those who want to and has demanded that they be allowed to leave.

Contemporary South Korean-born defectors

North Korea has targeted its own defectors with propaganda in attempts to lure them back as double defectors, but contemporary South Korean defectors born outside of North Korea are generally not welcome to defect to the North. In recent years there have been seven people who tried to leave South Korea, but they were detained for illegal entry in North Korea, and ultimately repatriated. As of 2019, there are reportedly 5461 former South Korean citizens living in North Korea.

There has also been fatalities as a result of failed defections. One defector died in a failed murder-suicide attempt by her husband while in detention. One person who attempted to defect was shot and killed by South Korean military forces in September 2013.

This is an incomplete list of notable cases of defections from South Korea to North Korea.

 1986
Choe Deok-sin, a former South Korean Foreign Minister defected with his wife, Ryu Mi-yong, to North Korea.
 1998
 Song Ki-chan, a South Korean fisherman from Incheon defected to North Korea. Song sailed his trawler to an unnamed port in the North.
 2004 
 A 33 year old South Korean soldier named Chen was arrested for violating the National Security Law by secretly crossing in to North Korea and providing information about the military unit he served in. Chen made it to Hoeryong in North Hamgyŏng Province of North Korea by crossing the Tumen River running through the Jilin province of China. Deported by the North as an illegal entrant and repatriated to South Korea from China, Chen was suspected of providing military information to North Korea like the location of the air force fighter wing he served in and the location of anti-air batteries.
 2005
 A 57 year-old South Korean fisherman named Hwang Hong-ryon in the Hwangman-ho crossed the Northern Limit Line into North Korea whilst reportedly "dead drunk". The South Korean navy fired some 20 warning shots from various arms, including a 60 mm mortar, but were unable to stop the ship.
 2009
 30 year old Kang Tong-rim cut a hole in the demilitarized zone fence and defected whilst reportedly wanted in South Korea. He was later deported back to the south. The hole was not found until over 24 hours later when South Korea was alerted through North Korean media.
 2019
 Choe In-guk, the son of former South Korean Foreign Minister Choe Deok-sin, said he had decided to "permanently resettle" in North Korea to honour his parents' wish that he live there and devote himself to the unification of the Korean peninsula, according to North Korea’s state-controlled news website Uriminzokkiri.
 2022
 An unidentified South Korean citizen had defected to North Korea at the start of January by crossing into the Demilitarized Zone.

List of notable defectors

Choe Deok-sin, a South Korean foreign minister
Ryu Mi-yong, the chairwoman of Chondoist Chongu Party and wife of Choe
Kim Bong-han, a North Korean researcher of acupuncture
Oh Kil-nam, a South Korean economist who later defected back to the South
Shin Suk-ja, the wife of Oh Kil-nam, who was held together with their daughters as prisoners of conscience
Ri Sung-gi, a North Korean chemist known both for his invention of vinalon, and possible involvement in nuclear weapons research
Roy Chung (born Chung Ryeu-sup), the fifth U.S. Army defector to the North

See also
Americans in North Korea
List of Western Bloc defectors, for other South Korean defectors who are not listed here
North Korean defectors

References

Further reading
 
 

 
History of South Korea
Korean migration
North Korea–South Korea relations